Clyde's Prime Rib is a steakhouse in Portland, Oregon.

Description 
Clyde's Prime Rib is a castle-themed steakhouse with a dark dining room, located on Sandy Boulevard in northeast Portland's Rose City Park neighborhood. The interior features chandeliers, red banquettes, and wood paneling. The menu includes prime rib, country-friend steak, steak bites, Cobb salad, French onion soup, and prime rib soup. Sides include potato, jus, and seasonal vegetables. As of 2016, Clyde's offered a half-pound prime rib plate for $15 on Sundays. In 2018, the restaurant's most expensive steak was a 16 oz. ribeye for $36. The restaurant hosts live jazz.

History 
Established in 1954, Clyde's is among Portland's oldest restaurants. The business was Black-owned, as of 2015. Alex Bond purchased the restaurant from Clyde Jenkins in 2015.

Reception 
Erin DeJesus included the restaurant's prime rib in Eater Portland's 2014 list of "18 of Portland's Iconic Meat Dishes", in which she described Clyde's as "hilariously old-school". Michael Russell included Clyde's in The Oregonian's 2017 list of Portland's ten best steakhouses. He also included Clyde's in the newspaper's 2018 list of "Northeast and North Portland's 40 best restaurants". Daniel Barnett and Krista Garcia included the Lounge Burger in Eater Portland's list of "17 Mind-Blowing Burgers in Portland and Beyond".

See also

 List of steakhouses

References

External links
 

1954 establishments in Oregon
Restaurants established in 1954
Rose City Park, Portland, Oregon
Steakhouses in Portland, Oregon